Nebria velebiticola is a species of ground beetle in the Nebriinae family that is endemic to Croatia.

References

External links
Nebria velebiticola at Fauna Europaea

velebiticola
Beetles described in 1902
Beetles of Europe
Endemic fauna of Croatia